"Eurotrash" is a term for certain Europeans, particularly those perceived to be socialites, stylish and affluent. Eurotrash is often used as a collective term for such European expatriates in the United States or other areas with a concentration of wealthy Europeans. Some consider Eurotrash as a derogatory term, whereas others see it as a humorous, ironic description of themselves or others. There have been discussions in various forums to clarify its intent, with a majority view that the original meaning was not intended to imply impoverished or trashy Europeans, or be the European equivalent of "white trash".

Among the early printed uses of the term was in the early 1980s, when Taki Theodoracopulos, a wealthy Greek living in New York City, wrote a newspaper column titled "Eurotrash" in The East Side Express. The term was also used into the 1990s, with American band Cracker releasing a single called "Euro-Trash Girl". The song's narrator describes a dissolute life, drifting across Europe in pursuit of an "angel in black," the titular Euro-trash girl.

See also

References 

Anti-European sentiment
Class discrimination
European diaspora
Pejorative terms for European people
1980s neologisms